GO-1 is a submarine communications cable system that links Sicily to Malta, operated by the Maltese telecommunications company GO.

It currently consists of a single cable, laid in 1995, linking St George's Bay in Malta to Catania in Sicily. The laying of the second leg of the system, linking St Paul's Bay in Malta to Mazara del Vallo in Sicily, started in December 2008; it is expected to be operational in early 2009. As of December 2019, a third leg of the system was planned to connect with Marseille, France

There were reports of cable failure on the St. George's Bay/Catania cable in December 2008, concurrent with the failure of several other cable systems at around the same time.
It has been speculated that these multiple failures of apparently unrelated submarine cable systems may have been related to seismic activity in the region.

See also
 VMSCS, another Malta-Sicily cable system
 2008 submarine cable disruption

References

External links
 Works on the GO-1 Mediterranean Cable System start at St Paul’s Bay
 Cable-laying works on GO's second submarine link start at St Paul's Bay
 GO to connect Malta to France and north-eastern Africa

Submarine communications cables in the Mediterranean Sea
Telecommunications in Malta
Italy–Malta relations
1995 establishments in Italy
1995 establishments in Malta